Chosen (stylized onscreen as CH:OS:EN accompanied by a ticking sound) is an American action-thriller streaming television series from Ben Ketai and Ryan Lewis, airing via online streaming video service Crackle. Each season consisted of six episodes released simultaneously: season one was released on January 17, 2013; season two was released on December 13 that same year; the third and final season was released on April 15, 2014. Two weeks later,  Crackle announced it had renewed the series for a fourth season, but no other information was released until series star Milo Ventimiglia tweeted, on June 20, 2016, that the fourth season would not be moving forward.

A Chinese remake of the series premiered worldwide on Netflix in March 2018.

Plot
Ian Mitchell is a lawyer, divorced from Laura and father of their young daughter Ellie. Ian receives a box containing a gun and a picture of a stranger, along with instructions to kill the pictured person. He is subsequently attacked by another stranger, and discovers that he has been chosen by a mysterious organization known as The Watchers to participate in a lethal game. Along with his daughter and ex-wife, Ian must deal with Jacob, another player forced into the game.

Cast
Chad Michael Murray as Jacob Orr
Milo Ventimiglia as Ian Mitchell
Nicky Whelan as Laura Mitchell
Sarah Roemer as Avery Sharp
Brandon Routh as Max Gregory
Caitlin Carmichael as Ellie Mitchell
Diedrich Bader as Daniel Easton
Rose McGowan as  Josie Acosta
Brett Davern as Paul

Episodes

Broadcast
All six episodes of season one of Chosen premiered in Australia on FX on June 16, 2013.
All 18 episodes of the first three seasons of Chosen were aired in Germany on 13th Street on February 2, 2015 through March 9, 2015.

Chinese adaptation
A three-part Chinese adaptation was released on iQIYI in China and Taiwan in January 2018, and worldwide via Netflix in March 2018. The remake, a Chinese-Australian co-production set in Australia, follows the core plot of the series but makes changes to the characters; for example, the main character is a surgeon instead of a lawyer, portrayed by Lan Cheng-lung. The series also stars Sam Hayden-Smith, Deng Jiajia and Jenny Zhou.

References

External links

2013 American television series debuts
2014 American television series endings
2010s American drama television series
English-language television shows
Crackle (streaming service) original programming
American action television series
American thriller television series
Television shows about death games